The 2018 Women's Hockey SOMPO CUP is the first Hockey SOMPO CUP, an international women's field hockey tournament, consisting of a series of test matches. It will be held in Japan, from September 12 to 16, 2018, and will feature four of the top nations in women's field hockey.

Competition format
The tournament featured the national teams of Australia, South Korea, United States, and the hosts, Japan, competing in a round-robin format, with each team playing each other once. Three points were awarded for a win, one for a draw, and none for a loss.

Results

Pool matches

Classification matches

Third and fourth place

Final

Statistics

Goalscorers
2 goals

 Stephanie Kershaw
 Renee Taylor 
 Kanon Mori

1 goal

 Naomi Evans
 Ambrosia Malone
 Georgina Morgan
 Hayley Padget
 Akiko Imao
 Natsuha Matsumoto
 Moe Sasaki
 Minami Shimizu
 Miyu Suzuki
 Mai Toriyama
 Moeka Tsubouchi
 Kim Eun-ji
 In Ha-wa
 Kim Jeong-ihn
 Lee Yu-rim
 Jill Funk
 Kathleen Sharkey 
 Taylor West 
 Nicole Woods

References

International women's field hockey competitions hosted by Japan
Sombo Cup
field hockey
field hockey
field hockey
field hockey